Upington (Nama: //Khara hais) is a town founded in 1873 and located in the Northern Cape province of South Africa, on the banks of the Orange River. The town was originally called Olijvenhoutsdrift ('Olive wood drift'), due to the abundance of olive wood trees in the area, but later renamed after Sir Thomas Upington, Attorney-General and then Prime Minister of the Cape. It originated as a mission station established in 1871 and run by Reverend Christiaan Schröder. The mission station now houses the Kalahari Orange Museum. The museum is also the home of a donkey statue, which recognises the enormous contribution that this animal made to the development of the region during the pioneering days of the 19th century.

The elevation of Upington is 2,742 feet (835 metres). It is the closest large centre to the Augrabies Falls (arguably the greatest of South African waterfalls) and the Kgalagadi Transfrontier Park. The landscape is very arid but the soil is fertile and crops such as fruit are grown in irrigated fields. The area is best known for its export-quality grapes, raisins and wines, which are cultivated on the rich flood plains of the Orange River.

The Upington 26
On 13 November 1985, a black policeman was killed following a disturbance at a political meeting in Paballelo, a black township on the outskirts of Upington. Twenty-six people were charged with the killing, of whom twenty-five were convicted of murder on the basis of common purpose, and one convicted of attempted murder. Fourteen were sentenced to death, although the death sentences were later overturned on appeal. In 2011, a memorial in honour of the Upington 26 was unveiled in Upington by Hazel Jenkins, the Premier of the Northern Cape. In 2014, the Australian film A Common Purpose was made about the case.

Wine industry 
Upington's most famous wines are produced by an organisation known as Orange River Cellars. The organisation has six depots in the area (all of them on the banks of the Orange River) at Upington, Kanoneiland, Grootdrink, Kakamas, Keimoes and Groblershoop. Their wines are exported, inter alia, to Europe and the USA.

Transportation 

Upington Airport has scheduled flights provided by SA Airlink. Due to the combination of high elevation and temperature, one of the airport's runways is 4,900 m long (the fourth longest in the world), and thus allows Boeing 747 and other heavy aircraft to use the airport without limitations on take-off weight.

In the first half of the 20th century, there was a passenger train service from Cape Town to Upington. Until the 1950s, a narrow-gauge railway line (two-foot gauge) ran from Upington to Kakamas and Keimoes, two nearby towns. The trains carried passengers and freight, being mainly dried fruit. The line to Kakamas was still in use during the November 2010 grape harvest season.

Shopping 

Shopping in Upington is characterised by High Street shopping, with most stores located along Scott, Schroder, Nelson Mandela and Mark Streets. Upington has a mall, which is the area's first super-regional mall. The Kalahari mall is anchored by Game, Checkers, Spar, Woolworths, Tiger Wheel & Tyre and clothing stores, banks and restaurants. It is located on the corner of Van Riebeeck and Malherbe Streets.

Geography and climate 

Upington is located on the northern banks of the Orange River and is surrounded by irrigated vineyards. Also the driest month of the year, July sees an average rainfall of only , while the wettest month of March sees .
Upington has been noted as being the sunniest location on the planet for three months of the year, from November through January.

Upington has a hot desert climate (BWh) with long, hot summers and short, mild winters. Precipitation peaks during late summertime.

Notable natives and residents 

 Chris Brink – mathematician, vice-chancellor of Newcastle University in England, vice-chancellor and rector of Stellenbosch University
 Ruben Cloete – footballer for the South Africa national soccer team
 Alice Krige – actress
 Tiaan Strauss - rugby player for Western Province and the Springboks. Later for Australia.
 Shaleen Surtie-Richards - actress
 Christo Wiese - South African businessman
 Cobus Wiese - rugby union player
 Jasper Wiese – rugby union player for the South Africa national rugby union team

Gallery

See also 
 Vastrap, South Africa's former nuclear weapons test range.

References

External links 

 Additional information about Upington Airport
 The Orange River Wine Cellars Home Page
 Upington Business Directory
 Racially motivated land dispossession in Gordonia: Memorial lecture on the 1913 Natives Land Act

Orange River
Populated places in the Dawid Kruiper Local Municipality
Populated places established in 1873
1884 establishments in the Cape Colony